usNIC (user-space NIC) is Cisco's low-latency computer networking product for MPI over 10 Gigabit Ethernet in high-performance computing.  It operates at the OSI model's data link layer (Ethernet frames) or the network layer (UDP packets) to eliminate the overhead of TCP within a data center. usNIC is shipped as firmware (with associated device drivers) for Cisco's "VIC" (virtual interface card) series of converged network adapters, and support has been contributed to Open MPI.

References

 
Ethernet